Lac-Vacher is an unorganized territory in the Côte-Nord region of Quebec, Canada, part of Caniapiscau Regional County Municipality.

It is named after Lake Vacher that is within the territory.

It is enclaved within it is the Naskapi reserved land of Kawawachikamach.

Demographics
Population trend:
 Population in 2021: 44
 Population in 2016: 0
 Population in 2011: 0
 Population in 2006: 0
 Population in 2001: 0
 Population in 1996: 0
 Population in 1991: 0

References

Unorganized territories in Côte-Nord